York—Humber was a federal electoral district represented in the House of Commons of Canada from 1953 to 1968. It was located in the province of Ontario. This riding was created in 1952 from parts of York South riding.

York—Humber consisted of the towns of Mimico and Weston (excluding the Ellis Court Apartments), the village of Swansea, and parts of the townships of Etobicoke and York in what was later known as Metropolitan Toronto.

The electoral district was abolished in 1966 when it was re-distributed between Etobicoke, High Park, Lakeshore, York South and York West ridings.

Members of Parliament

This riding elected the following members of the House of Commons of Canada:

Election results

|-
  
|Progressive Conservative
|Margaret Aitken 
|align="right"|11,157 
  
|Liberal
|Kenneth L. Thompson 
|align="right"|11,090 
 
|Co-operative Commonwealth
|Jennie B. Prosser
|align="right"| 4,924   
|}

|-
  
|Progressive Conservative
|Margaret Aitken 
|align="right"|  18,449
  
|Liberal
|Kenneth L. Thompson 
|align="right"|10,851 
 
|Co-operative Commonwealth
|Margaret Thetford 
|align="right"| 4,872 

|}

|-
  
|Progressive Conservative
|Margaret Aitken 
|align="right"|23,723
  
|Liberal
|Elena Murdock Dacosta
|align="right"|9,557 
 
|Co-operative Commonwealth
|Leonard Collins 
|align="right"|6,257    
|}

|-
  
|Liberal
|Ralph Cowan 
|align="right"|15,526
  
|Progressive Conservative
|Margaret Aitken 
|align="right"| 14,864 
 
|New Democratic
|Charles Millard
|align="right"| 11,622

|}

|-
  
|Liberal
|Ralph Cowan
|align="right"|20,188    
  
|Progressive Conservative
|M. Douglas Morton
|align="right"|12,218
 
|New Democratic
|Charlie H. Millard
|align="right"|11,821   
|}

|-
  
|Liberal
|Ralph Cowan 
|align="right"| 17,172   
 
|New Democratic
|Don Stevenson
|align="right"|12,792   
  
|Progressive Conservative
|Victor Colebourn
|align="right"|11,325 
 
|New Capitalist
|D. C. Tilley
|align="right"|235
|}

See also 

 List of Canadian federal electoral districts
 Past Canadian electoral districts

External links 

 Website of the Parliament of Canada

Former federal electoral districts of Ontario
Federal electoral districts of Toronto